Sangoma is a 1988 album by Miriam Makeba. It was a comeback album after a long pause since Comme une symphonie d'amour  in 1979, spurred by touring with Paul Simon.

Track listing
"Emabhaceni" – 2:38
"Baxabene Oxamu" – 2:12
"Ngalala Phantsi" – 2:29
"Ihoyiya" – 1:27
"Kulo Nyaka" – 2:17
"Baya Jabula" – 2:22
"Mabhongo" – 1:22
"Ingwemabala" – 1:54
"Mosadi Ku Rima" – 3:10
"Angilalanga" – 2:16
"Ungakanani" – 1:25
"Ngiya Khuyeka" – 1:36
"Nyankwabe" – 1:56
"Sabumoya" – 1:47
"Congo" – 2:22
"Nginani Na" – 2:36
"Umam' Uyajabula" – 2:02
"Nyamuthla" – 2:29
"Icala" – 3:11

Personnel
Miriam Makeba – lead and backing vocals
Hugh Masekela – music consultant, additional percussion, backing vocals
Jason Miles – synthesizer programming
Tony Cedras – keyboards
Okyerema Asante – percussion
Zenzi Lee, Russ Titelman – additional percussion
Brenda Fassie, Linda Bottoman-Tshabalala – backing vocals
Technical
Alexandra Saraspe-Conomos – assistant producer
William Coupon – cover photography

References

1988 albums
Miriam Makeba albums
Albums produced by Russ Titelman
Warner Records albums